Shiv Narain was an Indian cricketer. He was a wicket-keeper who played for Delhi. He was a wicket-keeper.

Narain made a single first-class appearance for the side, during the 1944-45 season, against Northern India. He scored a duck in the first innings in which he batted, and 10 runs in the second, as the team lost by an innings margin.

Narian took one stumping.

References

External links
Shiv Narain at Cricket Archive

Indian cricketers
Delhi cricketers
Wicket-keepers